Olesia Semenchenko (born ;  	April 27, 1979) is a Ukrainian female handballer, who plays as a goalkeeper in the Turkish Women's Handball Super League for Kastamonu Bld. GSK and the Ukrainian national team.

Semenchenko played in her country for Automobilist Brovary (1997–1999), Karpati Uzhgorod (2000–2001), Transportnyk" Brovary (2001–2002), HC Spartak Kyiv (2002–2004) and HC Galychanka  (2007–2009) before she moved in 2009 to Greece to join Ormi Patras, where she was until 2012. In the 2015–16 season, she transferred to Turkey for Kastamonu Bld. GSK.

References 

1979 births
Ukrainian female handball players
Ukrainian expatriate sportspeople in Greece
Ukrainian expatriate sportspeople in Turkey
Kastamonu Bld. SK (women's handball) players
Expatriate handball players in Turkey
Living people
Sportspeople from Ternopil Oblast